Joachimsthal, sometimes spelled Joachimstal, may refer to:

Places 
 Joachimsthal, Bohemia, former name of Jáchymov, Czechia, famous for its silver and uranium mines and which gave its name to the Joachimsthaler currency
 Joachimsthal, Brandenburg, a town in the Barnim district in the Brandenburg province, Germany
 Joachimsthal (Amt), the corresponding local administrative district
 Joachimsthalsches Gymnasium, a boarding school originally established in Joachimsthal, Brandenburg
 Joachimstal, now Joaoru, a subsidiary manor on the Joala estate in the Vaivara parish of Virumaa, Estonia

People 
 Ferdinand Joachimsthal (1818–1861), Silesian-German mathematician
 Georg Joachimsthal (1863–1914), German physician